MV Morning Bird was a ferry that sunk in the Buriganga River in Dhaka, Bangladesh, with more than 50 passengers on board on 29 June 2020, killing at least 34 people. The incident took place at around 9:30 am local time near Shyambazar area after being hit by another launch Mayur-2. During the incident the Morning Bird was heading toward the Port of Dhaka, Sadarghat from Munshiganj.

References

2020 disasters in Bangladesh
2020 in Bangladesh
2020s in Dhaka
Disasters in Dhaka
Ferries of Bangladesh
June 2020 events in Asia
Maritime incidents in 2020
Maritime incidents in Bangladesh
Shipwrecks in rivers